Jonathan Josiah Hollibaugh (July 13, 1891 - June 11, 1953) served in the California State Assembly for the 52nd district from 1943 to his death in 1953 and during World War I he served in the United States Army.

References

External links

United States Army personnel of World War I
1891 births
1953 deaths
20th-century American politicians
Republican Party members of the California State Assembly